The Sukhoi S-70 Okhotnik-B, also referred to as Hunter-B, is a Russian stealth heavy unmanned combat aerial vehicle (UCAV) being developed by Sukhoi and Russian Aircraft Corporation MiG as a sixth-generation aircraft project. The drone is based on the earlier Mikoyan Skat, designed by MiG, and encompassing some technologies of the fifth-generation Sukhoi Su-57 fighter jet. In the future, it is planned to act under the control of pilots of Su-57 jets, similarly to the USAF Skyborg programme.

Development
The Okhotnik has been under development since at least 2011, when Sukhoi was selected by the Russian Defense Ministry to lead a programme for a new heavy unmanned reconnaissance and attack drone. The new UCAV is being jointly developed by MiG and Sukhoi, based on data of the earlier Mikoyan Skat UCAV programme. The work is carried out by the Novosibirsk Aircraft Production Association (NAPO), part of the Sukhoi company. In the documents, the drone is characterised as a "sixth-generation unmanned aerial vehicle".

The first mock-up intended for ground tests was created in 2014. Prototype of the drone was first revealed in July 2017, showing the drone's flying wing configuration.

In November 2018, the drone performed first series of taxiing, speeding and stopping tests in fully autonomous mode at a runway of the NAPO plant. During the runs, it has reached a maximum speed of 200 km/h.

On 18 January 2019, the third flyable Su-57 prototype (bort no. 053) was spotted wearing a new digital camouflage paint scheme, with digital silhouette of the Okhotnik on its top and underside and a unique markings on the vertical tail showing the shape of a UCAV flying alongside the shape of Su-57 with a lightning bolt (universally used to show electronic connectivity and data sharing) between the two. On 24 January 2019, first flyable prototype of the drone was seen towed at the NAPO plant. According to Russian officials, the Su-57 is being used as a flying laboratory for the testing of the Okhotnik's avionics systems.

In late May 2019, Okhotnik performed a series of flight tests during which the drone flew several meters above a runway of the NAPO plant.

On 3 August 2019, Okhotnik performed its maiden flight. The drone flew for about 20 minutes at an altitude of 600 meters above Chkalov State Flight Test Center in Akhtubinsk, and made several circles around the airfield. On August 7, the Russian Defence Ministry released a video of the first flight.

On 27 September 2019, Russian MoD released a video showcasing the first flight of Okhotnik alongside Su-57. Reportedly the UAV operated autonomously and flew for more than 30 minutes interacting with the Su-57 to test extending the fighter's radar and target designation range for use of long-range air-launched weapons from the outside of enemy air defenses.

On 12 February 2021, it was reported that three additional prototypes were under construction at the Novosibirsk Chkalov Aviation Plant, according to a source in the military-industrial complex. The second model is a modified copy of the 1st prototype while the 3rd and 4th prototypes will be identical to the serial production unit. The improvements will relate to the systems of onboard radio-electronic equipment and structural elements of the airframe. The three additional prototypes should be ready for flight tests in 2022 and 2023. The source in the military-industrial complex also said that the serial Hunter will receive a standard flat nozzle to further reduce their thermal and radar signature.

On 28 February 2021, it was reported that the Okhotnik will be used aboard the future Project 23900 Ivan Rogov amphibious assault ships, capable of carrying 4 Okhotnik drones, for reconnaissance and strike missions.

The second prototype was rolled out in December 2021, with a new flat jet nozzle.

Okhotnik reportedly tested unguided weapons like free-fall bombs in 2021 and carried out tests with precision-guided munitions in 2022.

Design
The Okhotnik's design is based on the flying-wing scheme and incorporates use of composite materials and stealth coatings, making the drone low-observable in flight. It has a weight of about 20 tons and a wingspan around 65 feet (20 m). The drone is powered either by a single AL-31F turbofan, as used on the Sukhoi Su-27 fighter aircraft, or by the improved AL-41F derivative installed on Su-35S fighters and Su-57 prototypes. Although the first prototype's exhaust nozzle was conventional and could increase the drone's radar signature, future upgrade could see improved exhaust as well as engine inlet as shown by a mock up at the 2019 MAKS International Aviation and Space Salon. The maximum speed of the drone is reportedly 1,000 km/h while carrying its payload internally. It is likely the Okhotnik was designed to act as a "loyal wingman" controlled by the Su-57. 
The aircraft bears some visual resemblance to RQ-170. It is speculated that the Russian engineers could have had access to the one that was captured by Iranians, but similar design of flying-wing Mikoyan Skat was in development since 2005 and Okhotnik is a further development by Sukhoi of the former MiG design. The second prototype received a flat jet nozzle.

Specifications (Sukhoi S-70)

See also

References

External links
 Sukhoi Design Bureau 

Single-engined jet aircraft
Unmanned military aircraft of Russia
Sukhoi aircraft
Unmanned stealth aircraft
Aircraft first flown in 2019
Flying wings